Colus sabini is a species of sea snail, a marine gastropod mollusk in the family Colidae, the true whelks and the like.

Description

Distribution
This species occurs in the North Atlantic Ocean; alo off Japan.

References

 Gofas, S.; Le Renard, J.; Bouchet, P. (2001). Mollusca, in: Costello, M.J. et al. (Ed.) (2001). European register of marine species: a check-list of the marine species in Europe and a bibliography of guides to their identification. Collection Patrimoines Naturels, 50: pp. 180–213
 Howson, C.M.; Picton, B.E. (Ed.) (1997). The species directory of the marine fauna and flora of the British Isles and surrounding seas. Ulster Museum Publication, 276. The Ulster Museum: Belfast, UK. . vi, 508
 Mayhew, R.; Cole, F. (1994). A taxonomic discussion and update of shell-bearing marine molluscs recorded from NW Atlantic North of Cape Cod (excluding Greenland), and Canadian Arctic Archipeligo
 Abbott R. T. (1974). American seashells. The marine Mollusca of the Atlantic and Pacific coast of North America. ed. 2. Van Nostrand, New York. 663 pp., 24 pls.
 Clark R.N. (2016). Notes on some little known Arctic Alaskan mollusks. The Festivus. 48(2): 73-83

External links
 Brøgger W.C. 1900-1901. Om de senglaciale og postglaciale nivåforandringer i Kristianiafeltet (Molluskfaunan). Norges Geologiske Undersøgelse, 31: 1-731, pl. 1-19
 Gray, J.E. (1824). Shells. in: Parry W.E. (ed.) Supplement to Appendix, Parry's Voyage for the Discovery of a north-west passage in the years 1819-1820, containing an account of the subjects of Natural History. London: John Murray Appendix 10, Zool.: 240-246
 Mörch, O. A. L. (1876). Description d'espèces nouvelles. Journal de Conchyliologie. 24: 368-374
 Jeffreys, J. G. (1883). On the Mollusca procured during the cruise of H. M. S. Triton, between the Hebrides and Faeroes in 1882. Proceedings of the Zoological Society of London. (1883): 389-399, pl. 44
 Friele H. 1879. Catalog der auf der norwegischen Nordmeer-Expedition bei Spitzbergen gefundenen Mollusken. Jahrbücher der Deutschen Malakozoologischen Gesellschaft, 6: 264-286
 Gofas, S.; Le Renard, J.; Bouchet, P. (2001). Mollusca. in: Costello, M.J. et al. (eds), European Register of Marine Species: a check-list of the marine species in Europe and a bibliography of guides to their identification. Patrimoines Naturels. 50: 180-213

Colidae
Gastropods described in 1824